Knollcrest is a census-designated place (CDP) in the town of New Fairfield, Fairfield County, Connecticut, United States. It is in the northeast part of the town, on a peninsula on the western side of Candlewood Lake. It is bordered to the northeast, across Squantz Cove, by Bogus Hill.

Knollcrest was first listed as a CDP prior to the 2020 census. The community was established in 1936.

Windmill

Knollcrest is known for its Dutch-style windmill. It was constructed in 1936 as a functional water pump. The structure is 80 feet tall and houses a 3,000 gallon copper water tank. The windmill currently serves as the main office for the community. It was commissioned by the Homelander Company and was designed by Charles A. Federer.

References 

Census-designated places in Fairfield County, Connecticut
Census-designated places in Connecticut